Leonid Fedorovich Bykov (11 December 1928, in Znamenka village, Artemivsk Okruha of Ukrainian SSR – 11 April 1979, in Kiev Oblast of Ukraine, USSR) was a Soviet actor, film director, and script writer. He received the "Honored Artist of the RSFSR" title in 1965 and the "People's Artist of the Ukrainian SSR" title in 1974.

Life and career
Leonid Bykov was born in the Znamenka village into a peasant family of Feodor Ivanovich Bykov and Zinaida Pankratovna Bykova, who shared the same surname. He had an elder sister, Luisa (born 1927). His father was a simple laborer who took part in the World War I and the Russian Civil War and in 1930 moved his family to Kramatorsk to work at the local steel mill, and where Leonid finished the secondary school.

Bykov initially attempted to become a military pilot. He later studied at Kharkiv Theater Institute from 1946 to 1951 and joined the troupe of the Taras Shevchenko Theater in Kharkiv, working on stage until 1960. He received recognition initially with the supporting role of an unsophisticated countryman in Marina's Destiny (1953). His other notable performances included Petya Mokin in Aleksandr Ivanovski’s and Nadezhda Kosheverova’s blockbuster comedy Tamer of Tigers (1955) and in the title role of Maksim Perepelitsa (1956). Bykov also appeared as a hopeless romantic in films such as Yuri Egorov’s Volunteers (1958), Stanislav Rostotskii’s May Stars (1961), and Iosif Kheifits’s My Dear Man (1958). As a director, Bykov debuted at Lenfilm Studio in 1962 with the 
10-minute satire However the Rope Is Twisted (co-directed by Gerbert Rappaport), which skewered 
absurdities of the Soviet economy. The popular comedy Bunny (1965), in which Bykov also played the lead, portrays an idealistic man who struggles against bureaucracy. His most famous films as director are World War II dramas Only "Old Men" Are Going Into Battle (1974) and One-Two, Soldiers Were Going... (1977), in which he also starred.

Bykov died in a traffic accident in 1979 on the highway from Minsk to Kyiv. In 1994, the International Astronomical Union named a minor planet after him, (4682) Bykov.

Selected filmography

Actor
 Marina's Destiny  (1953)
 Tamer of Tigers  (1954-1955)
 Other People's Relatives  (1955)
 Maksim Perepelitsa (1955)
 The Volunteers  (1958)
 May Stars  (1959)
 Alyosha's Love (1960)
 Be Careful, Grandma!  (1960)
 No Rope Curls (1961)
 Seven Winds (1962)
 The Horizon (1962)
 Little Hare  (1964)
 In S. City (1966)
 The Scouts  (1968)
   (1971)
 Only "Old Men" Are Going Into Battle   (1973)
  One-Two, Soldiers Were Going...  (1976)

Film director
 No Rope Curls (1961)
 Little Hare  (1964)
   (1971)
 One-Two, Soldiers Were Going... (1976)
 Only "Old Men" Are Going Into Battle (1973)

Screen writer
 Only "Old Men" Are Going Into Battle (1973)

References

External links

Biography of Leonid Bykov (in Russian)

1928 births
1979 deaths
People from Cherkaske, Donetsk Oblast
Soviet film directors
Soviet male film actors
Ukrainian film directors
Ukrainian male film actors
Recipients of the title of People's Artists of Ukraine
Recipients of the Shevchenko National Prize
Road incident deaths in the Soviet Union
Burials at Baikove Cemetery
 Honored Artists of the RSFSR